Dobrova pri Dravogradu is a village south of Dravograd in the Carinthia region in northern Slovenia.

Name
The name of the settlement was changed from Dobrova to Dobrova pri Dravogradu in 1955.

Church
The local church is built on a small hill south of the main settlement. It is dedicated to the Holy Cross. It was built in 1845.

References

External links
Dobrova pri Dravogradu on Geopedia

Populated places in the Municipality of Dravograd